Mandorcasa (possibly from Quechua mantur achiote, q'asa mountain pass) is a mountain in the northwest of the Vilcabamba mountain range in the Andes of Peru, about  high. It is situated in the Cusco Region, La Convención Province, Vilcabamba District. Mandorcasa lies west of Choquetacarpo.

References

Mountains of Peru
Mountains of Cusco Region